Ervin Zsiga (born 11 July 1991) is a Romanian footballer, who currently plays for CSM Satu Mare.

Career

FC Vaslui

He signed a 5-year contract with FC Vaslui in the summer of 2012. He made his debut in Liga I against Petrolul Ploiesti on 29 July 2012. Due to his poor performances he left FC Vaslui and joined the third division team Fortuna Brazi.

Club statistics

Updated to games played as of 5 February 2020.

References

External links 
 Liga1.ro

1991 births
Living people
Sportspeople from Satu Mare
Romanian people of Hungarian descent
Romanian footballers
Association football midfielders
FC Olimpia Satu Mare players
FC Vaslui players
Balmazújvárosi FC players
Kaposvári Rákóczi FC players
Liga I players
Nemzeti Bajnokság I players